Fall River is an American documentary television miniseries directed and produced by James Buddy Day. Jason Blum serves as an executive producer under his Blumhouse Television banner. It follows the Fall River murders in Fall River, Massachusetts by a satanic cult. It consists of 4-episodes and premiered on May 16, 2021, on Epix.

Plot
The series follows the Fall River murders in Fall River, Massachusetts by a satanic cult. The leader of the cult, Carl Drew was sentenced to life in prison. Twenty years later, the lead investigator re-investigates the case after inconsistencies begin to haunt him.

Episodes

Production
In February 2021, it was announced James Buddy Day had directed a 4-part series revolving around the Fall River murders with Jason Blum set to executive producer under his Blumhouse Television banner, with MGM Television set to produce and distribute internationally, while Epix will distribute in the United States.

References

External links
 
 

2021 American television series debuts
2021 American television series endings
2020s American television miniseries
2020s American documentary television series
English-language television shows
Television series based on actual events
True crime television series
Television series about cults
Television series by MGM Television
MGM+ original programming